Black Gold is a 1947 American drama western film directed by Phil Karlson and starring Anthony Quinn, Katherine DeMille and Raymond Hatton. It was the first Monogram Pictures film released under the Allied Artists banner and had the highest budget in Monogram's history at the time. It was also the first leading role for Anthony Quinn.

Synopsis
Charley, an Indian, finds a Chinese boy, Davey, and adopts him. Charley has a mare, Black Hope, with whom he wishes to win the Kentucky Derby, so he trains Davey as a jockey.

Cast
Anthony Quinn as Charley Eagle
Katherine DeMille as Sarah Eagle
Ducky Louie as Davey
Raymond Hatton as Buckey
Kane Richmond as Stanley Lowell
Thurston Hall as Colonel Caldwell
Moroni Olsen as Dan Toland
Jonathan Hale as Senator Watkins
Elyse Knox as Ruth Frazer
 Charles Trowbridge as Judge Wilson
 Alan Bridge as 	Dr. Jonas
 James Flavin as 	Mac
 Norman Willis as 	Monty 
 Clem McCarthy as Commentator
Darryl Hickman as Schoolboy
 Franklyn Farnum as 	Kentucky Derby Race Official 
 Eddie Acuff as Caldwell's Ranch Foreman
 Carmen D'Antonio as 	Mexican Woman

Production
The film was loosely based on the true story of the horse Black Gold, who won the 1924 Kentucky Derby.

Karlson later said: "I made such a strong statement that the Indian nations all picked it up. They realized what we were saying in there. The average guy that would go see a motion picture in those days went to see entertainment. We weren't making statements, we were making cops 'n' robbers and good guys and bad guys. But to look at something and see the truth, for a change, was something that was unusual in those days."

Karlson also said that the film took a year to make because "I wanted the seasons. I went to Churchill Downs for the Derby and had to do the races here, and I had to get some desert scenes... a lot  of time lapses in the picture." He directed four other films while making Black Gold.

References

External links

Black Gold at TCMDB

1947 films
Films directed by Phil Karlson
American sports drama films
1940s sports drama films
American Western (genre) films
1947 Western (genre) films
1947 drama films
1940s American films